"Jij bent zo" is a single by Dutch singer Jeroen van der Boom, released in 2007. It is a Dutch-language cover of the song "Silencio" by Spanish singer David Bisbal.

Both songs are identical, but their lyrics are vastly different. "Silencio" tells the story of someone who feels hurt because his lover left him, and "Jij bent zo" ("That's the way you are") is about someone who overcame his differences with his lover and respects her the way she is. In both versions, every line in the chorus ends with an O.

In August 2007, the song climbed to the top of the Dutch music charts. "Jij bent zo" is Van der Boom's debut in the Dutch Top 40, and at the same time his first number one hit.

Charts

Certifications

References

Dutch pop songs
Dutch-language songs
2007 debut singles
Ultratop 50 Singles (Flanders) number-one singles
Dutch Top 40 number-one singles
2007 songs